João Campos de Araújo (born 28 December 1962) commonly referred to as João Campos is a Brazilian politician and pastor. Although born in Tocantins, he has spent his political career representing Goiás, having served as state representative since 2003.

Personal life
João Campos is a pastor of the Assembleias de Deus church. The institutions endorsement of him was key to his election in 2002. However, for the 2018 election the church leadership decided to endorse rival candidate Glaustin da Fokus in the Goiás election. He is married to Ilda Rodrigues Campos and is an alumnus of the Pontifical Catholic University of Goiás.

Political career
João Campos voted in favor of the impeachment against then-president Dilma Rousseff and political reformation. He would later back Rousseff's successor Michel Temer against a similar impeachment motion, and also voted in favor of the Brazil labor reform (2017).

João Campos caused some controversy during the 2010-11 legislative session when he proposed a bill promoting conversion therapy.

References

1962 births
Living people
People from Tocantins
Republicans (Brazil) politicians
Brazilian Assemblies of God pastors
Members of the Chamber of Deputies (Brazil) from Goiás